Sean Garrity may refer to:
Sean Garrity (director), a Canadian film director and screenwriter.
Sean Garrity member of band Full Circle
Sean Garrity, a character in the television series Rescue Me
Sean Gerrity, founder of American Prairie, a nature reserve in Montana